Carlos Taberner was the defending champion but was not eligible to compete in the tournament due to his ATP ranking.

Nuno Borges won the title after defeating Ryan Peniston 6–4, 6–3 in the final.

Seeds

Draw

Finals

Top half

Bottom half

References

External links
Main draw
Qualifying draw

Antalya Challenger III - 1